Spatulosia is a genus of moths in the subfamily Arctiinae. The genus was erected by Hervé de Toulgoët in 1966.

Species
 Spatulosia griveaudi Toulgoët, 1972
 Spatulosia legrandi Toulgoët, 1965
 Spatulosia malgassica Toulgoët, 1965

References

Lithosiini